Mount Stevenson el.  is a mountain peak in the Absaroka Range of Yellowstone National Park.  Mount Stevenson was named in 1871 by geologist Ferdinand Hayden during the Hayden Geological Survey of 1871 for his friend and chief assistant, James Stevenson (1840–1888).  Stevenson, who had run away from home as a young boy, first met Hayden in 1853 during an exploration of the Dakota Badlands.  In 1866, Stevenson began working for Hayden and did so until 1879.  Hayden specifically cited Stevenson's loyalty to him in his 1872 report on the 1871 survey of the park.  Stevenson Island on Yellowstone Lake is also named for James Stevenson.

See also
 Mountains and mountain ranges of Yellowstone National Park

Notes

Mountains of Wyoming
Mountains of Yellowstone National Park
Mountains of Park County, Wyoming